The 1918 Idaho gubernatorial election was held on November 5, 1918. Republican nominee D. W. Davis defeated Democratic nominee H. F. Samuels with 59.95% of the vote.

General election

Candidates
D. W. Davis, Republican 
H. F. Samuels, Democratic

Results

References

1918
Idaho
Gubernatorial